Aditi Singh Sharma is an Indian playback singer. She made her playback singing debut in Bollywood with Anurag Kashyap's Dev.D. Sharma is known for her work in movies like Dev.D, No One Killed Jessica, Dhoom 3, 2 States, Agent Vinod, and Heroine among others.

Early life and career
Aditi was born in New Delhi, India. She completed her education in Moscow, Russia and later on moved to Mumbai to pursue her a career as a singer. She showed an interest in music from a very young age. Her father died when she was 20. She began her career as a playback singer with the song "Yahi Meri Zindagi" in the film Dev.D directed by Anurag Kashyap.

She has performed in numerous live concerts. She has appeared on MTV's Coke Studio and MTV Unplugged, her performance with Pritam & Arijit Singh at IIFA awards has received great reviews. She is currently managed by Mourjo Chatterjee (On Stage Talents)

Besides singing, Aditi is well known for her good cooking skills amongst her family and friends.

Playback singing

Accolades

References

External links
 

Bollywood playback singers
Living people
Indian women pop singers
Indian women playback singers
Year of birth missing (living people)
21st-century Indian singers
21st-century Indian women singers